Malleostemon roseus is a plant species of the family Myrtaceae endemic to Western Australia.

It blooms between July and December producing pink-white-yellow flowers.

It is found on undulating plains in an area in the extending from the Gascoyne into the Mid West, Wheatbelt and Goldfields-Esperance regions of Western Australia where it grows in sandy or clay soils.

References

roseus
Flora of Western Australia
Plants described in 1983